West Springfield is a suburb of Springfield, Massachusetts located on the west bank of Connecticut River.

Neighborhoods, alphabetized

 Amostown, West Springfield - Named for Amos Taylor, a settler in the 18th century
 Ashleyville, West Springfield - Named after the Ashley family  and located near Interstate 91 and Riverdale Street
 Cayenne, West Springfield - Named by resident Russell H. Pepper, as a parody of his own name and located near Morgan Road and Riverdale Street
 Downtown West Springfield - Area surrounding Elm St, Park St, and Van Deene Ave. Also known as Center.
 Memorial, West Springfield - Area closest to Memorial Ave and the Big E
 Merrick, West Springfield - Named after the Merrick family, prominent land owners in the most densely settled part of town.
 Mittineague - An Indian name for the same place, and located on the north bank of the Westfield River
 Paucatuck, West Springfield (archaic) - area near Paucatuck Brook, west of Tatham
 Tatham, West Springfield (Tawtum, Tattom) - An Indian name for the same place, located northwest and west of Mittineague
 Ramapogue, West Springfield (archaic) - the area west of the Common and east of the hills

References

Neighborhoods in Springfield, Massachusetts